Krymov, female Krymova may refer to one of the following:
Nikolay Krymov (1884—1958), Russian painter and art theoritican
Aleksandr Krymov, Russian general of World War I and Russian Revolution times
Yury Krymov

Russian-language surnames